Tiyan High School (THS) is a senior high school in Barrigada, Guam. It is a part of the Guam Department of Education.

It was scheduled to take students from Adelup, Anigua, Barrigada, Barrigada Heights, Hagåtña, Las Palmas, Macheche, Maina, Maite, Mogfog, Mongmong, Tiyan, and Toto.

The school opened in August 2014. About 1,400 students were scheduled to attend the school on opening day. It opened with a practice gymnasium. Construction on the school's full-size gymnasium began in 2015. The full-size gym is being built for $14.4 million, or $576,218.61 each year for 25 years.

References

External links
 Tiyan High School

2014 establishments in Guam
Public high schools in Guam
Educational institutions established in 2014
Barrigada, Guam